Yukio Tanaka may refer to:

 Yukio Tanaka (baseball) (born 1967), Japanese baseball player
 Yukio Tanaka (biwa) (born 1948), Japanese biwa player